The following is a list of massacres that have occurred in Venezuela (numbers may be approximate):

Venezuela
Massacres

Massacres